Disney's Castaway Cay, or simply Castaway Cay, is a private island in the Bahamas which serves as an exclusive port for the Disney Cruise Line ships. It is located near Great Abaco Island and was formerly known as Gorda Cay. In 1997, The Walt Disney Company purchased a 99-year land lease (through to 2096) for the cay from the Bahamian government, giving the company substantial control over the island.

Castaway Cay was the first private island in the cruise industry where the ship docks on the island, eliminating the need for guests to be tendered to land.

Castaway Cay now has approximately 140 Disney Cruise Line permanent residents who keep the island running daily.

History

Gorda Cay
Gorda Cay was first settled in 1783. Gorda's airstrip (now Castaway Cay Airport) was once used as a stop in the 1930s for bootleggers and later, drug runners.

Gorda Cay had also been used for filming. The beach where Tom Hanks first encounters a nude Daryl Hannah in Splash is on the island, and parts of the film Pirates of the Caribbean: The Curse of the Black Pearl were filmed on the cay as well.

Castaway Cay
In 1997, the Disney Cruise Line purchased a 99-year lease for Gorda Cay from the Bahamian government and renamed it Castaway Cay, intending for it to be the line's private island. The company spent $25 million over 18 months of construction. This included dredging 50,000 truckloads of sand from the Atlantic Ocean. The pier and its approaches (a 1,700 foot channel) were constructed to allow Disney ships to dock directly alongside the island, thus removing the need for tenders to get the passengers ashore.

An additional race, Castaway Cay Challenge, was added to the Walt Disney World Marathon weekend series in 2015 with the 5K race taking place on Castaway Cay.

Facilities

A post office on the island has special Bahamian postage and postmark specific to Disney Cruise Line. The island is developed in the theme of a castaway community with buildings made to look as if they had been improvised after a shipwreck. The facilities are maintained like any other Disney theme park; the shops accept guests' stateroom keys for payment. Food service is operated as an extension of the cruise package. A variety of activities are available to guests including bicycle rentals, personal watercraft rentals, massages overlooking the ocean, snorkeling, parasailing, volleyball, and basketball. There are monkey bars and a rope for children to climb across set about  into the ocean on one beach and a slide about  into the ocean on another beach. There are three beaches for guests: one exclusively for families, one exclusively for cabana guests, and another exclusively for adults, called Serenity Bay.

Two submarine-ride vehicles from the now-closed 20,000 Leagues Under the Sea: Submarine Voyage ride at Walt Disney World lie underwater in the snorkeling area. The Flying Dutchman pirate ship, from the Pirates of the Caribbean film series, was formerly on display in the lagoon, but as of November 2010, it had been removed and taken to another location on the island where it was dismantled.

Airport

Castaway Cay Airport  is a private use airport located in Castaway Cay, the Bahamas.

See also
List of islands of the Bahamas
Lighthouse Point, Bahamas, Disney's second private island

References

External links 

Disney Castaway Cay
 

Resorts in the Bahamas
Private islands of the Bahamas
Disney Cruise Line
Abaco Islands